A dance hall is a room for dancing.

Dance hall or dancehall may also refer to:

 Dance hall (Jamaican), a music venue in Jamaica
 Dance Hall (1929 film), an American musical
 Dance Hall (1931 film), a French drama film
 Dance Hall (1941 film), an American comedy film
 Dance Hall (1950 film), a British film
 Dancehall, a musical genre
 "Dance Hall", a song by Modest Mouse on the album Good News for People Who Love Bad News